Davis Bowels Wills (January 26, 1877 – October 13, 1959) was a Major League Baseball first baseman for the 1899 Louisville Colonels. He went to college at the University of Virginia.

External links

1877 births
1959 deaths
Major League Baseball first basemen
Baseball players from Virginia
Louisville Colonels players
19th-century baseball players
Burials at Arlington National Cemetery
Sportspeople from Charlottesville, Virginia